The Randolph College for the Performing Arts (formerly Randolph Academy for the Performing Arts) is a private career college specializing in singing, dancing and acting. It was founded on September 8, 1992, by George C. Randolph Jr. It is located in Toronto, Ontario, on the southwest corner of Lennox Street and Bathurst streets, just south of the former Honest Ed's. The building that was formerly the Bathurst Street Theatre (now the Randolph Theatre) houses the school.

History
The school is located in the former Bathurst Street United Church, which was constructed in 1888.

The school was founded in 1992 by its former president, George C. Randolph Jr. Randolph was a former principal dancer with the Alvin Ailey Repertory Ensemble and with Les Ballets Jazz de Montreal.

The current college program artistic director is Michael Reinhart. Previous artistic directors include: Ron Singer (1993-2009), Darlene Spencer (2009-2016) and Tamara Bernier Evans (2016-2019).

It offers post-secondary professional training in their branded "Triple Threat" skills of dancing, singing, and acting for the stage and screen. All coursework takes place in English. Students are auditioned from across Canada, and internationally. In addition, Randolph Kids Performing Arts program offers classes in singing, dance and acting to students aged 3–17.

Notable alumni
Lisa Berry
Krystal Garib
Adam Korson
Paul Alexander Nolan
Jess Salgueiro
Sergio Trujillo

See also
List of colleges in Ontario
Higher education in Ontario

References

External links

1992 establishments in Ontario
Drama schools in Canada
Dance schools in Canada
Universities and colleges in Toronto
Private colleges in Ontario
Educational institutions established in 1992